Dexter is an American television drama that was broadcast on the premium cable channel Showtime from October 1, 2006, to September 22, 2013. A total of 96 episodes of Dexter were broadcast over eight seasons. 

The series is based on characters created by Jeff Lindsay for his "Dexter" series of novels, and follows the life of Dexter Morgan (Michael C. Hall), a Miami Metro Police Department blood pattern analyst with a double life. While investigating murders in the homicide division, Dexter hunts and kills murderers and criminals who have escaped the justice system. Although the first season is based on the events of Darkly Dreaming Dexter, the series' subsequent seasons do not follow the novels in the series. Departing from the narrative of Lindsay's second Dexter novel Dearly Devoted Dexter, the show's writer Daniel Cerone said that the writers "didn't see the opportunity in the second book" to adapt it.

The series has received generally favorable reviews from critics, while the second season received universal acclaim. The pilot episode, which aired in the USA on October 1, 2006, attracted more than a million viewers, giving Showtime its highest series ratings in nearly two years. Due to a dearth of original programming as a result of the 2007–08 Writers Guild of America strike, CBS began broadcasting Dexter in edited form on free-to-air television on February 17, 2008, thus making Dexter the first program in two decades to air on a national broadcast network after being shown on a premium cable channel. Eight seasons comprising twelve episodes each have been broadcast in the United States and abroad.  All eight seasons have been released on DVD and on Blu-ray; box sets containing the first three seasons were released on August 18, 2009, on both DVD and Blu-ray.

The show received multiple nominations for various awards, winning 52—including four Primetime Emmy Awards, two Golden Globe Awards, seven Satellite Awards, six Saturn Awards, one Screen Actors Guild Award, and one TCA Award—and was twice selected by the American Film Institute as one of the ten best television programs of the year in 2006 and 2007. Other nominations include PGA Awards, WGA Awards, and Peabody Awards.

In October 2020, it was announced that Dexter would return with a 10-episode limited series titled Dexter: New Blood, starring Michael C. Hall in his original role, with Clyde Phillips returning as showrunner. It premiered on November 7, 2021, and concluded on January 9, 2022.

Series overview

Episodes

Season 1 (2006)

Season 2 (2007)

Season 3 (2008)

Season 4 (2009)

Season 5 (2010)

Season 6 (2011)

Season 7 (2012)

Season 8 (2013)

Dexter: Early Cuts
In 2009, Showtime started releasing an animated Dexter webseries. Each story is told in several two-minute chapters, the first three of which were written by series writer and producer Lauren Gussis, and premiered in 2009. More episodes were released in 2010 and 2011.

Season 1 (2009–10)

Season 2: Dark Echo (2010)

Season 3: All in the Family (2012)

Home releases

References

External links 

 at Showtime

Episodes
Lists of American crime drama television series episodes
Lists of mystery television series episodes

it:Dexter (serie televisiva)#Episodi
pl:Dexter (serial telewizyjny)#Odcinki